Tai Tung Wo Liu or Tin Liu is a village of in the Shap Sze Heung area of Sai Kung North, in Tai Po District, Hong Kong.

Administration
Tai Tung Wo Liu is a recognized village under the New Territories Small House Policy.

References

External links
 Delineation of area of existing village Tin Liu (Sai Kung North) for election of resident representative (2019 to 2022)

Villages in Tai Po District, Hong Kong